Rock Point may refer to:
 Places
In the United States:
 Rock Point, Arizona
 Rock Point, Maryland
 Rock Point, Oregon

 Other
 Low Rock Point, a point forming the west side of the entrance to Church Bay, near the west end of the north coast of South Georgia
 Big Rock Point Nuclear Power Plant, was a nuclear power plant near Charlevoix, Michigan
 Rock Point Community School, a school in Rock Point, Arizona
 Rock Point Provincial Park, a park located on the north shore of Lake Erie near the mouth of the Grand River in the Carolinian zone of southwestern Ontario
 Rock Point School, a school in Burlington, Vermont
 Rock Point Gift & Stationery, an imprint of The Quarto Group

See also
 Rocky Point (disambiguation)